Disposable Income is an album by English punk rock band Snuff. It was released in March 2003 on the Union 2112 record label. The band previously released many albums on American independent label Fat Wreck Chords.

Track listing
All songs written by Snuff
"Angels 1-5" – 3:50    
"Other Half of You" – 2:30    
"Chocs Away" – 2:33    
"Once Upon a Time Far Far Away" – 2:20    
"Dehumanised" – 4:57    
"7 Days (Solomons Boring Week)" – 2:03    
"To Disappoint" – 3:50    
"Heads You Win Tails You Lose" – 6:08    
"Boatnick (So It Goes)" – 3:49    
"Wearenowhere" – 1:41    
"Salad" – 2:43    
"Lies" – 2:33    
"Pages 42-43" – 4:34    
"Coming Through" – 3:19    
"Emoticon" – 11:04    
"All Over Now" – 3:30

Credits
 Duncan Redmonds – vocals, drums
 Frank Stapleton – guitar
 Pete Zapasta – guitar
 Leo Erinmold – bass
 DJ Shadwell – piano, percussion
 Cookie Saban – harmonica
 Terry Edwards – saxophone, trumpet, keyboards
 G. Granville – trombone
 Hurmarna Tehwin – keyboards
 Produced by Paul Corkett and Snuff
 Engineered by Dan Austin

References

External links
[ Allmusic Guide album page]

2003 albums
Snuff (band) albums